The Government of Rajasthan has established the Jail department to manage 145 jails. Mainly Ajmer, Bharatpur, Bikaner, Jaipur, Jodhpur, Kota and Udaipur are seven zones.

Ajmer Zone
A total of twenty one jails are in Ajmer zone.
 Four central jails are in Ajmer
 Central Jail Ajmer
  High Security Jail
 Jail Training Institute
 Women Reformatory Ajmer
 One 'A' Category district prison is in Tonk.
 Two 'B' Category district prison are in Bhilwara and Nagaur.
 Ten Sub Jails are in Ajmer.
 Beawar
 Deedwana
 Gulabpura
 Gangapur
 Jahazpur
 Malpura
 MandalGarh
 Merta City
 Parbatsar
 Shahpura
 Four open air camps are in Tonk open air camp, Nagaur open air camp, Bhilwara open air camp and Ajmer open air camp.

Bharatpur Zone
Twelve jails are in Bharatpur zone.
 Two central jail in Bharatpur Central Jail Bharatpur and Women Reformatary Bharatpur,
 One 'A' category district prison is in Dhaulpur.
 Two 'B' Category district prison are in Sawai Madhopur and Karauli.
 Four sub jails are in Bharatpur.
 Bayana
 Deeg
 Hindaun City
 Gangapur City
 Three open air camps are in Bharatpur open air camp, Dholpur open air camp and Karoli open air camp.

Bikaner Zone
Twenty five jails are in Bikaner zone.
 Three central jails are Central Jail Bikaner, Central Jail Ganganagar and Women Reformatary Bikaner in Bikaner zone.
 There is no 'A' category jail in Bikaner.
 Three 'B' category jails are in Hanumangarh, Churu and Bikaner.
 Nine sub jails are in Bikaner.
 Nokha
 Shri karanpur
 Raisingh Nagar
 Suratgarh
 Bhadra
 Nohar
 Rajgarh
 Ratangarh
 Anupgarh
Ten open air camps are in Bikaner.
 Jaitsar Ganganagar open air camp
 Agricultural Tr. Bichwal Bikaner open air camp
 Hanumangarh open air camp
 A.R.F. Ganganagar open air camp
 Those sheep C.R.C Bicwal Bikaner open air camp
 Narsinghpur Birani Ganganagar open air camp
 Goluwala Hanumangarh open air camp
 S. K. G. Padampura Ganganagar open air camp
 Pakkasarna Hanumangarh open air camp
 Sh.G.G sithal Belasar Bikaner open air camp

Jaipur Zone
Twenty two jails are in Jaipur zone.
 Three central jails Central Jail Jaipur, Central Jail Alwar, Women Reformatory Jaipur are in Jaipur.
 There is no 'A' category district prison in Jaipur.
 Four 'B' Category district prison are in Dausa, Jhunjhunu, Sikar and Jaipur.
 Eight sub jails are in Kotputli, Sambhar, Bandikui, Khetri, Neem Ka Thana, Fatehpur, Behror, Kishangarh Bas.
Seven open air camps are in Jaipur zone.
 Sanganer open air camp
 Durgapura open air camp
 Alwar open air camp
 Sikar open air camp
 Jhunjhunu open air camp
 Khatu Shyam open air camp
 Dausa open air camp

Jodhpur Zone
Twenty three jails are in Jodhpur zone.
 Three central jails are Central Jail Jodhpur, Women Reformatory Jodhpur and Young Offenders Reformatory Jaitaran in Jodhpur zone.
 There is no 'A' category prison in Jodhpur zone.
 Five 'B' category district prisons are in Barmer, Jaisalmer, Jalore, Pali and Sirohi.
 Ten sub jails are in Bilara, Phalodi, Balotara, Sanchore, Bhinmal, Pokharan, Bali, Jaitaran, Sojat City and Abu Road.
 Five open air camps are in Jodhpur zone.
 Mandore open air camp
 Keshwana (Jalore) open air camp
 Barmer open air camp
 Jaisalmer open air camp
 Sirohi open air camp

Kota Zone
Sixteen jails are in Kota zone.
 Two Central jails are in Kota zone.
 Central Jail Kota
 Women Reformatory Kota
 There is no 'A' category district jail in Kota zone.
 There are three 'B' category district jails are in Baran, Bundi and Jhalawar.
 Seven sub jails are in Ramganjmandi, Sangod, Chhabra, Nainwa, Aklera, Bhawani Mandi and Atru in Kota zone.
 Four open air camps are in Kota zone.
 Kota open air camp
 Jhalawar open air camp
 Bundi open air camp
 Baran open air camp

Udaipur Zone
Twenty five jails are in Udaipur zone.
 Two Central jails are in Udaipur zone.
 Central Jail Udaipur
 Women Reformatory Udaipur
 There is no 'A' category district jail in Udaipur zone.
 There are five 'B' category district jails are in Banswara, Chittorgarh, Dungarpur, Pratapgarh and Rajsamand in Udaipur zone.
 Twelve sub jails are in Kanod, Jhadol, Kotda, Mavali, Salumber, Kusalgarh, Sagwada, Bhim, Begu, Choti Sadari, Kapasan and Nimbahera in Udaipur zone.
 Six open air camps are in Udaipur zone.
 Udaipur open air camp
 Pratapgarh open air camp
 Chittorgarh open air camp
 Dungarpur open air camp
 Banswara open air camp
 Rajsamand open air camp

Open Prisons 
The Open prison system was started in 1955 in Rajasthan and prisoners are governed by The Rajasthan Prisoners Open Air Camp Rules, 1972. Thirty-nine open air camps are in Rajasthan in seven divided zones.

Central Jails 
Nineteen Central Jails are in Rajasthan in seven zones.

See also 
 Prisons in India

References

External links 
 http://ePrisons.nic.in/NPIP/Public/DashBoard.aspx

 Rajasthan
India,Rajasthan
Lists of buildings and structures in India
India government-related lists
India law-related lists